Villaverde Bajo, is a railway station serving the area of Villaverde in Madrid, Spain. Is owned by Adif and operated by Renfe Operadora. The station is served by Cercanías Madrid line C-3 and C-4.

It should not be confused with the homonymous station of Madrid Metro, as there is no direct access between the two stations.

References

Cercanías Madrid stations
Railway stations in Madrid
Villaverde (Madrid)
Railway stations in Spain opened in 1851